The 14525 / 26 Ambala Cantonment Junction - Shri Ganganagar Intercity Express is an Express train belonging to Indian Railways Northern Railway zone that runs between  and  in India.

Coaches
The 14525 / 26 Ambala Cantonment Junction - Shri Ganganagar Intercity Express has  one AC Chair Car,  four chair car, three general unreserved & two SLR (seating with luggage rake) coaches . It does not carry a pantry car coach.

As is customary with most train services in India, coach composition may be amended at the discretion of Indian Railways depending on demand.

Service

Routing

Traction
As the route is going to be electrified, a   based WDM-3A diesel locomotive pulls the train to its destination.

References

External links
14525 Intercity Express at India Rail Info
14526 Intercity Express at India Rail Info

Intercity Express (Indian Railways) trains
Rail transport in Haryana
Rail transport in Punjab, India
Rail transport in Rajasthan
Transport in Ambala
Transport in Sri Ganganagar